The Homeplace is a historic home and farm complex located at Madison, Madison County, Virginia. The original house was built about 1830, and is a gable-roofed hall-and-
parlor building with a rear shed addition, built of frame over a stone basement. It was extensively enlarged about 1875 by the addition of a two-story wing built on an I-house plan.  Also on the property are the contributing barn, well house, sun pit (greenhouse), bunkhouse for farm workers, meathouse, and a building which once
housed the furniture factory operated by the Clore family.

It was listed on the National Register of Historic Places in 1999.

References

Houses on the National Register of Historic Places in Virginia
Farms on the National Register of Historic Places in Virginia
Houses completed in 1830
Houses in Madison County, Virginia
National Register of Historic Places in Madison County, Virginia
1830 establishments in Virginia